The 2016–17 First Division was the 27th season of Norway's second highest ice hockey league, First Division.

The regular season began play on September 21, 2016, and was concluded on February 26, 2017.

The promotional and relegation playoffs began March 5, and ended March 23, 2017.

Participating teams

Team changes
Nes withdrew from the national league system in July 2016, following failure to meet league requirements. The vacant spot was given to Furuset. 
 Due to struggling economy, the board of the Tønsberg Vikings withdraw from the league in August 2016. The vacant spot was given to Gjøvik.

Regular season

Standings
Updated as of February 26, 2017.
x – clinched promotional playoff spot; y – clinched regular season league title; r – play in relegation series

Source: scoreboard.com

Playoffs

Promotional Playoffs

After the regular season ends, the two lowest ranked teams in the 2016–17 GET-ligaen and the two highest ranked teams in the First Division will compete for the right to play in the 2017–18 GET-ligaen. The tournament will be organized according to a double round robin format, where each club will play the others twice, home and away, for a total of six games. The points system and ranking method used, is the same as in the regular season.

Standings
Updated as of March 23, 2017.

q – qualified for next years GET-league; r – will play in next years 1. division

Source: hockey.no

Relegation Playoffs

After the regular season had ended, the two lowest ranked teams in the First Division and the two highest ranked teams in the Second Division competed for the right to play in the 2016–17 First Division. However, as second teams could not play in the First division, Storhamar 2 was ineligible to compete in the playoffs. The tournament was organized to be played over one weekend, where each club played the others once,  for a total of two games. The points system and ranking method used, was the same as in the regular season. The games was played in Tønsberg Ishall.

Standings
Updated as of March 12, 2017.

q – will play in next years 1. division; r – will play in next years 2. division

Source: hockey.no

References

External links
  

Norw
First Division
Norwegian First Division (ice hockey) seasons